Dagvin R. M. Anderson is a United States Air Force lieutenant general who serves as the director for joint force development of the Joint Staff. He previously served as the vice director for operations of the Joint Staff. He has also commanded the Special Operations Command Africa.

Military career

In July 2022, Anderson was nominated for promotion to lieutenant general and appointment as director for joint force development of the Joint Staff.

References

External links

Living people
Place of birth missing (living people)
Recipients of the Defense Superior Service Medal
Recipients of the Legion of Merit
United States Air Force generals
United States Air Force personnel of the Iraq War
United States Air Force personnel of the War in Afghanistan (2001–2021)
Year of birth missing (living people)